Tadros is a common Egyptian given name or family name. The family's origin is said to be in Greece or Egypt, but the name may also be prominent in other Middle Eastern countries with a Christian population including Jordan, Syria, Lebanon, Palestine. Most people with the last name Tadros are from Orthodox, mainly Coptic or Antiochian, Christian families brought to Egypt and the Middle East during the Byzantine Empire. Although the name is Greek and spans many states in the Middle East the origins of people named Tadros may be completely unrelated to each other: Coptic Egyptians with this last name are of Pharaonic and Greek descent while Antiochians are native to Jordan and Syrians to ancient peoples of the region around Damascus. In the United States many variations of the name have arisen due to misspellings and difficult pronunciation; some people with the names Tadros have created variations including Tadres, Tawadros and Tawadrous.

Religion
Tadros of Shotep or Theodore Stratelates or Theodore of Heraclea,  martyr and Warrior Saint venerated with the title Great-martyr in the Eastern Orthodox Church, Eastern Catholic and Roman Catholic Churches and Oriental Orthodox Churches

Persons
Notable people with the surname include:
Albert Tadros (1914–1993), Egyptian basketball player
Aly Tadros (born 1986), American singer-songwriter
Manuel Tadros (born 1956), Canadian singer, songwriter, actor
Monica Tadros (born 1974), American plastic and reconstructive surgeon
Sherine Tadros, British journalist
Wendy A. Tadros, Canadian civil servant and administrator
Xavier Dolan-Tadros (born 1989), sometimes just Xavier Dolan, Canadian actor
mikhaeil tadros [ born 1990] professional soccer player usa.

Music
Tadros (duo), a Canadian musical group made up of brothers Daniel and Eric Tadros

References

Arabic given names
Coptic given names
Greek-language surnames
Surnames